Herstmonceux Castle is a brick-built castle, dating from the 15th century, near Herstmonceux, East Sussex, England. It is one of the oldest significant brick buildings still standing in England.   The castle was renowned for being one of the first buildings to use that material in England, and was built using bricks taken from the local clay, by builders from Flanders.  It dates from 1441. Construction began under the then-owner, Sir Roger Fiennes, and was continued after his death in 1449 by his son, Lord Dacre.

The parks and gardens of Herstmonceux Castle and Place are Grade II* listed on the Register of Historic Parks and Gardens. Other listed structures on the Herstmonceux estate include the Grade II listed walled garden to the north of the castle, and the Grade II* listed telescopes and workshops of the Herstmonceux Science Centre.

History

Early history
The first written evidence of the existence of the Herst settlement appears in William the Conqueror's Domesday Book which reports that one of William's closest supporters granted tenancy of the manor at Herst to a man named 'Wilbert'. By the end of the twelfth century, the family at the manor house at Herst had considerable status. Written accounts mention a lady called Idonea de Herst, who married a Norman nobleman named Ingelram de Monceux. Around this time, the manor began to be called the "Herst of the Monceux", a name that eventually became Herstmonceux.

A descendant of the Monceux family, Roger Fiennes, was ultimately responsible for the construction of Herstmonceux Castle in the County of Sussex. Sir Roger was appointed Treasurer of the Household of Henry VI of England and needed a house fitting a man of his position, so construction of the castle on the site of the old manor house began in 1441. It was this position as treasurer which enabled him to afford the £3,800 construction of the original castle.

In 1541, Sir Thomas Fiennes, Lord Dacre, was tried for murder and robbery of the King's deer after his poaching exploits on a neighboring estate resulted in the death of a gamekeeper. He was convicted and hanged as a commoner, and the Herstmonceux estate was temporarily confiscated by Henry VIII of England, but was restored to the Fiennes family during the reign of one of Henry's children.

The profligacy of the 15th Baron Dacre, heir to the Fiennes family, forced him to sell in 1708 to George Naylor, a lawyer of Lincoln's Inn in London. Bethaia Naylor, who became the heiress of Herstmonceux on the death of her brother's only daughter, married Francis Hare and produced a son, Francis, who inherited in turn, his mother's property. The castle eventually came into the possession of Robert Hare-Naylor, who, upon the insistence of his second wife, Henrietta Henckell, followed the architect Samuel Wyatt's advice to reduce the Castle to a picturesque ruin by demolishing the interior. Thomas Lennard, 17th Baron Dacre, was sufficiently exercised as to commission James Lamberts Jnr of Lewes (1741–1799) to record the building in 1776. The castle was dismantled in 1777 leaving the exterior walls standing and remained a ruin until the early 20th century.

20th-century restoration 
Radical restoration work was undertaken by Colonel Claude Lowther in 1913 to transform the ruined building into a residence and, based on a design by the architect, Walter Godfrey, this work was completed by Sir Paul Latham in 1933. The existing interiors largely date from that period, incorporating architectural antiques from England and France. The one major change in planning was the combination of the four internal courtyards into one large one. The restoration work, regarded as the apex of Godfrey's architectural achievement, was described by the critic Sir Nikolaus Pevsner as executed 'exemplarily'.

Royal Greenwich Observatory

The Royal Observatory was founded by King Charles II at Greenwich in 1675. Observing conditions at Greenwich deteriorated following the urban growth of London, and plans were made in the early 20th century to relocate the observatory to a rural location with clearer, darker skies. Herstmonceux Castle and estate were put up for sale by their private owners and were sold in 1946 to the Admiralty, which then operated the Royal Observatory on behalf of the British government. The relocation of the observatory took place over a decade, and was complete by 1957. A number of new buildings were erected in the castle grounds. The institution at Herstmonceux Castle was known as the Royal Greenwich Observatory, where it remained until 1988, when the observatory relocated to Cambridge.

Several of the telescopes remain but the largest telescope, the 100 inch (254 cm) aperture Isaac Newton Telescope was moved to La Palma, in the Canary Islands, in the 1970s. The estate provides housing for the Equatorial Telescope Buildings, which have been converted for use as an interactive science centre for schoolchildren.  The empty dome for the Newton Telescope remains on this site and is a landmark, visible from afar.

University Study Centre
 
In 1992 Alfred Bader, an alumnus of Queen's University, Ontario, learned of the castle's vacancy and offered to purchase the castle for his wife; she declined, joking that there would be "too many rooms to clean". But in 1994, after intensive renovations, the Queen's International Study Centre was opened. It hosts primarily undergraduate students studying arts, science, or commerce through the Canadian University Study Abroad Program (CUSAP), as well as graduate students studying Public International Law or International Business Law. Specialty summer programmes (May–June) including engineering (Global Project Management), archeology, international health sciences, and law have become popular in recent years with students from both Queen's and other universities. In late January 2009, the ISC was renamed the Bader International Study Centre. As part of the 25th anniversary celebrations, new science and innovation labs were opened on the campus to increase the ability for first year science-tracked students to attend. In 2022, the Bader International Study Centre was renamed Bader College.

Historical retinue and events
Herstmonceux Castle is associated with a retinue of historical re-enactment troops including archers, knights, and falconers, who fly their birds over the grounds.  The castle is host to a large medieval weekend in August of each year, and is also hired out for weddings and weekend events.

Appearances in fiction 
The castle was used for filming part of The Silver Chair, a 1990 BBC adaptation of the book (one of The Chronicles of Narnia) by C. S. Lewis. The castle and gardens were used by comedians Reeves and Mortimer for one of their Mulligan and O'Hare sketches. In August 2002, The Coca-Cola Company rented the castle for use as part of a prize in a Harry Potter-themed sweepstakes—the castle served as "Hogwarts" in a day of Harry Potter-related activities for the sweepstakes winners. A "painting" of the castle was used as a magical cursed object in the U.S. television show Charmed – episode 2.3 "The Painted World".

Owners of Herstmonceux Manor/Castle

 

Owners have been as follows:
1066 – Edmer, a priest
1086 – Wilbert, tenant-in-chief
c.1200 – Idonea de Herst (married Ingelram de Monceux)
1211 – Her son Waleran de Monceux
1216 – His son William de Monceux
 ?   – His son Waleran de Monceux
1279 – His son John de Monceux
1302 – His son John de Monceux
1316 – His son John de Monceux
1330 – His sister Maud de Monceux (married Sir John Fiennes)
1351 – Her eldest son William Fiennes
1359 – His son Sir William Fiennes
1402 – His son Sir Roger Fiennes (built Herstmonceux Castle)
1449 – His son Sir Richard Fiennes (married Joan Dacre, 7th Baroness Dacre)
1483 – His grandson Sir Thomas Fiennes
1533 – Sir Thomas Fiennes
1541 – His eldest son Thomas Fiennes
1553 – His brother Gregory Fiennes
1594 – His sister Margaret Fiennes (married Sampson Lennard).
1612 – Her son Henry Lennard, 12th Baron Dacre
1616 – His son Richard Leonard
1630 – His son Francis Leonard
1662 – His son Thomas Leonard
1708 – Estate purchased by George Naylor for £38,215
1730 – His nephew Francis Naylor
1775 – His half-brother Robert Hare who demolished the castle in 1776
 ?   – His son Francis Hare Naylor
1807 – Purchased by Thomas Read Kemp
1819 – Purchased for John Gillon MP
1846 – Purchased by Herbet Barrett Curteis MP
 ?   – His son Herbert Mascall Curteis
 ?   – His son Herbert Curteis
1911 – Purchased by Lieutenant-Colonel Claude Lowther (restoration began)
1929 – Purchased by Reginald Lawson
1932 – Purchased by Sir Paul Latham (completed restoration under Walter Godfrey)
1946 – Purchased by H.M. Admiralty for The Royal Observatory
1965 – Transferred to the Science Research Council
1989 – Purchased by James Developments, transfers to a receiver, the Guinness Mahon Bank
1993 – Purchased for Queen's University, Ontario (Canada) as a gift from Drs. Alfred and Isabel Bader

See also
 Castles in Great Britain and Ireland
 List of castles in England
 List of sites on the National Register of Historic Parks and Gardens
 Herstmonceux Place

References
Notes

Bibliography

John Goodall in Burlington Magazine (August 2004).

External links

 of Herstmonceux Castle
Queen's University (Canada)'s Bader International Study Centre at Herstmonceux Castle
The Observatory Science Centre, Herstmonceux
 Map of the Royal Greenwich Observatory at Herstmonceux
 A Personal History of the Royal Greenwich Observatory at Herstmonceux Castle, 1948–1990 by George Wilkins, a former member of staff

Education in East Sussex
Castles in East Sussex
Houses in East Sussex
Queen's University at Kingston
Grade I listed buildings in East Sussex
Grade II* listed buildings in East Sussex
Grade II* listed parks and gardens in East Sussex
1441 establishments in England
Castle